Tierra de Léon is a Spanish Denominación de Origen Protegida (DOP) for wines located in the south of the province of León, in Castile and León, Spain, and covers an area of 3,317 km2 at an altitude of approximately 900 m above sea level. The area attained its D.O. status on 27 July 2007.

History
Grape cultivation was probably introduced by the ancient Romans. The area benefited from being at the crossroads of two important routes: The Way of Saint James, the pilgrimage route running east to west from France to Santiago de Compostela, and the Ruta de la Plata, running north–south between the silver mines of the Cantabrian coast and the southern port of Cadiz.

Around the 10th century, the main economic activities of the region were cereal production and milling, along with grape growing and winemaking, which was practiced in the monasteries of different religious orders. Production increased steadily over the centuries until 1887 which is when the phylloxera virus destroyed most of the vineyards of the area. Production did not pick up again until the 1920s.

In 1985, a group of producers applied for DO status based on the promotion of the local autochthonous grape variety known as Prieto Picudo.

Climate
The area has a continental climate (long, hot dry summers; cold winters). Temperatures in winter often fall below 0°C and there is frequent frosts and fog.

Soils
Alluvial soil, good drainage, poor in organic matter.

Varieties
 The recommended red grapes are: Prieto Picudo and Mencía; also authorized are Tempranillo and Garnacha.
 The recommended white grapes are: Verdejo, Albarín blanco, and Godello; also authorized are Malvasía and Palomino.

See also
Spanish wine
Leonese cuisine
Cuisine of the province of Valladolid

References

External links
 D.O. Tierra de León official website

Wine regions of Spain
Province of Valladolid
Province of León